South El Monte High School is a high school in South El Monte, California in the Los Angeles metropolitan area. It is a part of the El Monte Union High School District.

Asahi Gakuen, a part-time Japanese school, operates its San Gabriel campus (サンゲーブル校 Sangēburu-kō) at South El Monte High School.

In 2018, a 17-year-old boy who attended the high school was killed by his 16-year-old boyfriend and football teammate.

References

External links
 El Monte Union High School District

High schools in Los Angeles County, California